Three ships of the United States Navy have been named Albemarle,  after the Albemarle Sound in North Carolina.

 , was a schooner captured and taken into the Navy in 1863 and sold in October 1865.
 , a sunken former Confederate ironclad, raised and taken into the Navy in 1865, and sold in 1867.
 , was a seaplane tender in service from 1940 to 1960 and scrapped in 1975.

Sources

United States Navy ship names